Message is the second studio album by Japanese pop singer Aya Ueto. It was released on March 3, 2004 on Flight Master.

Background
Message includes Ueto's previous singles "Message/Personal", "Kanshō/Mermaid", "Binetsu" and "Ai no Tame ni.". The album's initial track listing included a fourteenth track entitled "Shiawase ni Naru Yō ni" (幸せになるように Wish You Happiness) but it was eventually scrapped and never released. The seventh track, "Taiyō to Tsuki", was initially called "Tonari ni Ite Hoshii" (I Want You By My Side), which is a line from the song's chorus. The second track, "Okuru Kotoba", is a cover of the Tetsuya Takeda-fronted folk band Kaientai's 1979 hit of the same name.

Chart performance
Message peaked at #4 on the Oricon Daily Albums Chart and debuted at #6 on the Weekly Albums Chart with 43,154 copies sold. The album charted for a total of eleven weeks and sold over 75,000 copies.

Track listing

Charts and sales

References

2004 albums
Aya Ueto albums
Pony Canyon albums